Hedysarum glomeratum is a species of flowering plant in the family Fabaceae.

Sources

References 

Hedysareae
Flora of Malta